Hourglass is Japanese singer songwriter Fayray's fifth studio album and first under the R and C label. The album was released on October 27, 2004. "Saisho de Saigo no Koi" served as image song for the movie anime "Mind Game"."feel" used as insert song in the Kansai TV/Fuji TV drama "At Home Dad Special" as well as the ending theme for the Yomiuri TV/Nippon TV series program "Afurica no Tume".

Track listing

Charts and sales

References

External links

2004 albums
Fayray albums